Jack Bicknell Jr. (born February 7, 1963) is an American football coach who is currently the offensive line coach at the University of Wisconsin. He was the head football coach at Louisiana Tech University from 1999 to 2006, compiling a record of 43–52 in eight seasons. He then served as assistant head coach and offensive line coach for Boston College for two seasons, before becoming the assistant offensive line coach for the New York Giants of the National Football League (NFL) in January 2008. Bicknell spent the 2013 season as offensive line coach for the NFL's Pittsburgh Steelers before being fired on January 3, 2014. He worked as an assistant coach with the Miami Dolphins in 2014 and 2015. He then returned to the college ranks, coaching at Ole Miss from 2017 to 2019, Auburn in 2020, Louisville in 2021, North Carolina in 2022, and is currently coaching offensive line at Wisconsin. Bicknell is the son of former Boston College head coach Jack Bicknell and the older brother of Bob Bicknell, who was most recently wide receivers coach for the Cincinnati Bengals.

Boston College
On December 12, 2007, Bicknell was hired by Texas Tech to serve as their offensive line coach. However, when Boston College offensive line coach Jim Turner resigned that August, Bicknell left the Red Raiders to rejoin BC.

In 2007, BC's offensive line ranked first in the ACC in sacks against, allowing just 22 sacks all season. His offensive line also paved the way for an ACC-leading 5,951 yards of total offense and a record breaking season by quarterback Matt Ryan. Bicknell also oversaw the development of Anthony Castonzo, the first true freshman to start on the BC offensive line since 1997 and a member of the All-ACC freshman team.

Head coaching record

References

External links
 Wisconsin profile
 North Carolina profile
 Louisville profile
 Auburn profile
 Ole Miss profile

1963 births
Living people
American football centers
Auburn Tigers football coaches
Boston College Eagles football coaches
Boston College Eagles football players
Kansas City Chiefs coaches
Louisiana Tech Bulldogs football coaches
Louisville Cardinals football coaches
New Hampshire Wildcats football coaches
New York Giants coaches
North Carolina Tar Heels football coaches
Pittsburgh Steelers coaches
Miami Dolphins coaches
Ole Miss Rebels football coaches
Wisconsin Badgers football coaches
People from North Plainfield, New Jersey
Coaches of American football from New Jersey
Players of American football from New Jersey